Crime Mob is the self-titled debut album by Atlanta rap group Crime Mob.  It produced three singles, "Knuck If You Buck", "Stilettos (Pumps)" and "I'll Beat Yo Azz", with music videos shot for all of them. "Knuck If You Buck" was certified Platinum by the RIAA in June 2006.

Critical reception

David Jeffries of AllMusic rated the album three out of five stars: "Crime Mob wouldn't know a new idea if it flew into their cough syrup, but they're as on point as crunk comes." Steve Juon of RapReviews rated it 3.5 points out of 10, panning the lyrical style as: "Say something really violent, rhyme it with something else, repeat ad nauseum." [sic] Robert Christgau rated the album as a "Dud", whose symbol  indicates "a bad record whose details rarely merit further thought."

Track listing

References 

2004 debut albums
Crime Mob albums
Albums produced by Lil Jon